Justice Martin may refer to:

 Brian Ross Martin (born 1947), judge of the Supreme Court of South Australia and a chief justice of the Supreme Court of the Northern Territory
 Celora E. Martin (1834–1909), judge of the New York Court of Appeals
 Charles D. Martin (politician) (1829–1911), member of Supreme Court Commission of Ohio
 Clarence R. Martin (1886–1972), associate justice and chief justice of the Indiana Supreme Court
 David Martin (Kansas judge) (1839–1901), associate justice of the Kansas Supreme Court
 Francois Xavier Martin (1762–1846), chief justice of the Louisiana Supreme Court
 George Martin (Michigan judge) (1815–1867), associate justice of the Michigan Supreme Court
 George Ewing Martin (1857–1948), chief justice of the United States Court of Appeals for the District of Columbia
 Harry Martin (judge) (1920–2015), associate justice of the North Carolina Supreme Court
 John E. Martin (1891–1968), chief justice of the Wisconsin Supreme Court
 Joseph Martin (Wisconsin politician) (1878–1946), associate justice of the Wisconsin Supreme Court
 Mark Martin (judge) (born 1963), chief justice of the North Carolina Supreme Court
 Robert N. Martin (1798–1870), judge of the Maryland Court of Appeals
 Wheeler Martin (1765–1836), associate justice of the Rhode Island Supreme Court
 William Bond Martin (c. 1769–1835), judge of the Maryland Court of Appeals

See also
 Martin Beddoe, circuit judge of England and Wales
 Judge Martin (disambiguation)